Under the Yoke is a science fiction novel by American writer S. M. Stirling, the second of four books in his alternate history series The Domination. It was first published in the United States on September 1, 1989.

Plot summary
Tanya von Shrakenberg, a Draka, establishes a plantation in the formerly-French Touraine after the Drakan subjugation of Continental Europe. Her slaves include Marya Sokolowska and Chantal Lefarge, formerly a Polish nun and a French Communist respectively. Fred Kustaa, an agent for the Alliance secret service (the OSS), is involved in the effort to keep a resistance movement alive in Europe. He smuggles weapons to guerillas in Finland, and later attempts to smuggle out the German professor Ernst Oerbach, who has vital knowledge on nuclear fusion. Marya Sokolowska is Fred's contact in this second mission. Meanwhile, Chantal is raped by Tanya's husband, and impregnated with twins. Fred attempts to flee, but fails, leading to the deaths of Fred, Marya, and Ernst. Chantal manages to escape to the United States on a submarine. In New York City, she gives birth to Fred and Marya Lefarge (named after her rescuers), who would be the protagonists of the next book in the series, The Stone Dogs, and who - though biologically the children of a Draka father - would be staunch enemies of the Draka.

References

External links

1989 American novels
Novels by S. M. Stirling
The Domination series
Dystopian novels
Canadian alternative history novels
American alternate history novels
Baen Books books